Xylotrupes socrates, commonly known as the Siamese rhinoceros beetle or fighting beetle, is a species of large scarab beetle belonging to the subfamily Dynastinae. It is particularly known for its role in insect fighting in Thailand.

Description

Like most dynastid beetles, the adult male of X. socrates possesses two horns: one on the head and another on the pronotum, both bifurcate and curling inward. Adult females lack these horns. Both sexes have dark chestnut-brown (is young) or black (is old) exoskeletons and elytra.

Distribution
The species is widespread in south-east Asian countries such as Bangladesh, Cambodia, China, India, Laos, Myanmar, Nepal, Thailand, and Vietnam.

Beetle fighting
These beetles are used for staging beetle fights, a traditional form of entertainment popular in the northern region of Thailand. They are captured and trained to become stronger and more aggressive. In the fight the beetle that lifts its opponent up by its horns wins. A beetle may also win if his opponent crawls away, falls, or is overturned. Insect fighting is mostly practiced in the Chiang Mai and Nan provinces of Thailand. It is also popular in Myanmar and Northern Laos. Spectators typically place bets on the fights. Insect fighting coaches claim their activity provides a free pastime while drawing attention to insects that would otherwise have been ignored or simply killed as pests.

References

External links
 

Dynastinae
Thai culture
Beetles described in 1864
Beetles of Asia
Insects of Laos
Insects of Bangladesh
Insects of India
Insects of Thailand
Insects of Vietnam
Insects of China
Insects of Nepal
Insects of Cambodia
Articles containing video clips